The Reaper is the fifth studio album by German heavy metal band Grave Digger. It was released on 2 November 1993 via the label GUN Records. This was the band's return after a long hiatus, released seven years after their previous album Stronger Than Ever.

Background 
A new line-up was formed except for the band leader, Chris Boltendahl and guitar player Uwe Lulis. The latter had convinced Boltendahl to release a new album in the first place, which was why he later on tried to get the name Grave Digger when he parted from the rest of the band (after the release of Excalibur). In this album there was a change towards darker lyrics and faster songs, as well as the start of the trend of featuring the Grim Reaper on the cover. The album cover image itself is a "Dance of Death" woodcut by 19th century German artist Alfred Rethel. Much of the material was written in the late 1980s, during Boltendahl's short-lived project, Hawaii.

Track listing 
All songs written and arranged by Grave Digger, except track 1 (Piet Sielck).

Personnel 
 Chris Boltendah – vocals
 Uwe Lulis – guitars
 Tomi Göttlich – bass
 Jörg Michael – drums

Additional musicians
 Piet Sielck – lead guitars on "And the Devil Plays Piano"; effects, keyboards on "Tribute to Death" and "The Madness Continues"
 Rolf Köhler – backing vocals
 Billy King – backing vocals

Production
 René Bonsink – photography
 Petrus Lohdograficus – layout
 Chris Boltendahl – producer, cover concept
 Tomi Göttlich – cover concept
 Peter Dell – cover layout
 Piet Sielck – producer, engineering, mixing, mastering
 Wolfgang Funk - executive producer
 Uwe Lulis – producer
 Mark Marthen – cover concept

References

External links

Grave Digger (band) albums
1993 albums
GUN Records albums